The Holy Virgin Cathedral, also known as Joy of All Who Sorrow, is a Russian Orthodox cathedral in the Richmond District of San Francisco.  It is the largest of the six cathedrals of the Russian Orthodox Church Outside Russia, which has over 400 parishes worldwide, and the cathedra of the Diocese of San Francisco and Western America.



History
Russian settlement in California began at Fort Ross in 1812.  The original San Francisco parish of the Russian Orthodox Church outside Russia was founded on June 2, 1927. An earlier Holy Virgin Cathedral was located at 858-64 Fulton Street between Fillmore and Webster Streets.  That building is still extant and was designated a San Francisco Landmark on May 3, 1970.

The current cathedral at 6219 Geary Boulevard in the Richmond District was founded by St. John of Shanghai and San Francisco, born Mikhail Maximovitch. The neighborhood is known for its Russian restaurants and shops, and the "most visible Russian presence is the magnificent Holy Virgin Cathedral".

Groundbreaking took place on June 25, 1961, construction was completed in 1965, and the cathedral was consecrated on January 31, 1977.  St. John, who died in 1966, is buried within the cathedral.

Architecture
The cathedral was designed by Oleg N. Ivanitsky, and features five onion domes covered in 24 carat gold leaf.  The "incredible beauty" of the interior, which is "lined by icons, religious paintings, and mosaics, and lit by a voluminous chandelier" can be seen only by those who attend religious services and go on visitation days.

The mosaic work on the outside of the building were done by Alfonso Pardiñas of Byzantine Mosaics.

Clergy and programs
The rector of the cathedral is Kyrill (Dmitrieff), Archbishop of San Francisco and Western America. The archbishop is a San Francisco native and a graduate of the University of San Francisco. The cathedral operates a K–12 school, the Saint John of San Francisco Orthodox Academy, as well as a bookstore and housing for senior citizens.

References

External links

Holy Virgin Cathedral, San Francisco
Virtual Tour of Cathedral
The Saint John of San Francisco Orthodox Academy

Cathedrals in San Francisco
Richmond District, San Francisco
Russian Orthodox cathedrals in the United States
Russian Orthodox church buildings in the United States
Russian Orthodox Church Outside of Russia
Russian-American culture in California
Churches completed in 1965
1960s architecture in the United States
Church buildings with domes
San Francisco Designated Landmarks
1965 establishments in California